Preston Patrick is a civil parish in the South Lakeland District of Cumbria, England.  It contains 25 listed buildings that are recorded in the National Heritage List for England.  Of these, one is listed at Grade II*, the middle of the three grades, and the others are at Grade II, the lowest grade.  The parish contains the villages of Preston Patrick and Crooklands, and is otherwise mainly rural.  The Lancaster Canal passes through the parish, and the listed buildings associated with it are bridges, an aqueduct, and milestones.  The other listed buildings consist of houses and associated structures, farmhouses, farm buildings, boundary stones, milestones on roads, a Quaker meeting house, and a church.


Key

Buildings

References

Citations

Sources

Lists of listed buildings in Cumbria